China Crime Information Center (CCIC) is the central database for tracking crime-related information of China. The CCIC is maintained by the Ministry of Public Security of the People's Republic of China since 1994.

Law enforcement agencies of China
Criminal records